Susan Wild (née Ellis; born June 7, 1957) is an American attorney and politician from the commonwealth of Pennsylvania. The district is in the heart of the Lehigh Valley, and includes Allentown, Bethlehem, Easton, and Bangor. Wild spent the last two months of 2018 as the member for  after Charlie Dent resigned in 2018. From September 2022 to January 2023 , she was chair of the House Ethics Committee. She continues to sit on the committee as ranking member. She also co-chairs the New Democrat Coalition Climate Change Task Force and is vice chair of both the Congressional Labor and Working Families Caucus and the Subcommittee on Africa, Global Health, Global Human Rights and International Organizations. Wild is the first woman to represent the Lehigh Valley in Congress.

Early life
Wild is the daughter of Norman Leith and Susan Stimus Ellis. Her mother was a journalist. Her father served in the United States Air Force during World War II and the Korean War. Wild was born at Wiesbaden Air Force Base, West Germany, while her father was stationed there. She also lived in France, California, New Mexico, and Washington, D.C.

Early political career 
Wild volunteered on Jimmy Carter's 1976 presidential campaign. She graduated from American University in 1978. She earned her Juris Doctor at George Washington University Law School in 1982. She studied under John Banzhaf. Wild became a partner at the law firm Gross McGinley in 1999.

Wild ran for Lehigh County Commissioner in 2013, but lost. She was appointed the first female solicitor of Allentown, Pennsylvania, in January 2015. She served as Solicitor of Allentown starting on January 7, 2015, when she was confirmed by the Allentown City Council.

U.S. House of Representatives

Elections

2018 general 

On December 31, 2017, Wild resigned from office to pursue her candidacy for the United States House of Representatives to succeed retiring Representative Charlie Dent (R) in 2018. Dent's district had previously been the 15th, represented by seven-term Republican Charlie Dent. She won a six-candidate Democratic Party primary election with 33% of the vote, narrowly defeating Northampton County District Attorney John Morganelli, and faced Republican Lehigh County Commissioner Marty Nothstein in the November 6 general election. She defeated Nothstein in the general election with 53.5% of the vote to Nothstein's 43.5%.

2018 special 

On the same day, Wild also ran in a separate special election for the balance of Dent's term; he had resigned in May after announcing the previous fall that he would not run for reelection. On November 15, 2018, it was announced that Wild had won the 15th congressional district's special election, receiving 130,353 votes to Nothstein's 129,593 votes.

There was a closer margin in the special election because that election was under the former 15th district, which had been thrown out by the Pennsylvania Supreme Court in February 2018. The former 15th had stretched from the Lehigh Valley into heavily Republican territory between Lebanon and Harrisburg, by way of a tendril in Berks County. The new 7th district is a more compact district centered in the Lehigh Valley, and includes a sliver of the Poconos.

2020 

Wild ran for reelection to a second term. She was unopposed in the Democratic primary and faced former Lehigh County Commissioner Lisa Scheller in the general election. Wild defeated Scheller with 51.9% of the vote, less than was expected.

2022 

Following the 2020 census, Wild was redistricted into a more competitive congressional seat. She was criticized by some district residents when she said of her new district, "Carbon County has many attributes, but it is a county that—although it was once an Obama county—it since has become a Trump county. I'm not quite sure what was in their heads because the people of Carbon County are exactly the kind of people who should not be voting for a Donald Trump, but I guess I might have to school them on that a little bit. But most of all, it is a very rural county."

In a rematch of the 2020 election, Wild defeated Scheller.

Tenure 

In 2021, Wild cosponsored a resolution to expel Representative Marjorie Taylor Greene from Congress, saying that Greene "advocated violence against our peers, the Speaker and our government".

As of November 2022, Wild had voted in line with President Joe Biden's stated position 100% of the time. In the 117th Congress, Wild voted with Speaker Nancy Pelosi 100% of the time.

Economy 
Wild is a self-described "pro-business" Democrat.

Elder policy 
In 2020, Wild co-sponsored a bill to reauthorize the Older Americans Act for five years with a 35% increase in funding. President Donald Trump signed the bill into law in March 2020.

Firearms 
In 2022, Wild voted for H.R. 1808: Assault Weapons Ban of 2022.

Foreign affairs 
Wild has been critical of Brazil's President Jair Bolsonaro for holding views she characterized as "far-right", "misogynistic", "homophobic" and "anti-immigrant". In March 2019, she and 29 other Democratic lawmakers wrote U.S. Secretary of State Mike Pompeo a letter that read in part, "Since the election of far-right candidate Jair Bolsonaro as president, we have been particularly alarmed by the threat Bolsonaro’s agenda poses to the LGBTQ+ community and other minority communities, women, labor activists, and political dissidents in Brazil. We are deeply concerned that, by targeting hard-won political and social rights, Bolsonaro is endangering Brazil’s long-term democratic future."

In February 2023, Wild signed a letter advocating for President Biden to give F-16 fighter jets to Ukraine.

Healthcare 
On January 31, 2023, Wild voted against H.R.497:Freedom for Health Care Workers Act, a bill that would lift COVID-19 vaccine mandates for healthcare workers.

On February 1, 2023, Wild voted against a resolution to end the COVID-19 national emergency.

Illegal immigration 
In 2019 Wild voted against a motion to allow victims of crimes by illegal immigrants in sanctuary cities to report the incident to the Department of Homeland Security.

On February 9, 2023, Wild voted against H.J.Res. 24: Disapproving the action of the District of Columbia Council in approving the Local Resident Voting Rights Amendment Act of 2022 which condemns the District of Columbia’s plan that would allow noncitizens to vote in local elections.

Impeachment of Donald Trump 
On December 18, 2019, Wild voted for the first article of impeachment, "abuse of power", and the second article of impeachment, "obstruction of Congress", against President Donald Trump.

Syria 
In 2023, Wild voted against H.Con.Res. 21, which directed President Biden to remove U.S. troops from Syria within 180 days.

Committee assignments 
Committee on Ethics (Ranking member)
Committee on Foreign Affairs
Subcommittee on Africa, Global Health, Global Human Rights and International Organizations (Vice Chair)
Subcommittee on Europe, Eurasia, Energy, and the Environment
Committee on Education and Labor
Subcommittee on Health, Employment, Labor, and Pensions
Committee on Science, Space and Technology
Subcommittee on Research and Technology

Caucus memberships 
New Democrat Coalition
Congressional LGBT+ Equality Caucus
Congressional Ukrainian Caucus
Black Maternal Health Caucus
New Democrat Coalition Climate Change Task Force (Co-Chair)
Congressional Labor and Working Families Caucus (Vice Chair)
 House Pro-Choice Caucus

Electoral history

Personal life 
Wild married Russell Wild in 1981. They divorced in 2003 after 22 years of marriage. They have two adult children. Following her divorce, Wild reunited with Kerry Acker, who remained her life partner until his death by suicide on May 25, 2019. She lives in South Whitehall Township, west of Allentown. She is Jewish.

See also
List of Jewish members of the United States Congress
Women in the United States House of Representatives

References

External links

 Congresswoman Susan Wild official U.S. House website
 Susan Wild for Congress official campaign website

|-

|-

|-

1957 births
21st-century American politicians
21st-century American women politicians
American women lawyers
American University alumni
Candidates in the 2018 United States elections
Democratic Party members of the United States House of Representatives from Pennsylvania
Female members of the United States House of Representatives
George Washington University Law School alumni
Living people
Jewish members of the United States House of Representatives
Jewish women politicians
Pennsylvania lawyers
Politicians from Wiesbaden
Women in Pennsylvania politics
American Jews from Pennsylvania